Petya Nedelcheva (born 30 July 1983) is a Bulgarian badminton player. She was born in Stara Zagora, Bulgaria. At the Bulgarian National Badminton Championships she won more than 20 titles.

Career 
A right-handed Nedelcheva became a professional badminton player since 1999, when she competed at the Balkan Games Championships. In 2001, she won bronze medals at the European Junior Badminton Championships in the girls' singles and doubles event. She also won the silver medal at the 2010 European Badminton Championships in the women's doubles event partnered with Anastasia Russkikh of Russia. At the 2014 European Badminton Championships she won bronze partnered with Imogen Bankier from Scotland. In 2015, she settled for bronze at the Baku 2015 European Games in the women's singles event.

Olympic Games 
Nedelcheva competed at the 2004 Athens, 2008 Beijing, and 2012 London Summer Olympics. In 2004, she plays in the women's singles and beat Tine Rasmussen of Denmark and Seo Yoon-hee of Korea in the first two rounds. In the quarterfinals, Nedelcheva lost to Zhou Mi of China 11-4, 11-1. Nedelcheva's partner in women's doubles was Neli Boteva. They were defeated by Ella Tripp and Joanne Wright of Great Britain in the round of 32. In 2008, she reached the third round in the women's singles event after defeat Sara Persson of Sweden and Hadia Hosny of Egypt in the first two rounds. In the third round, she lost to Wong Mew Choo of Malaysia in two sets. In 2012, she did not advance to the knock-out stage after placing 2nd in the group stage. She started off with a victory over Alesia Zaitsava from Belarus, but lost to Adriyanti Firdasari from Indonesia.

Achievements

European Games 
Women's singles

European Championships 
Women's doubles

European Junior Championships 
Girls' singles

Girls' doubles

BWF Superseries 
The BWF Superseries, which was launched on 14 December 2006 and implemented in 2007, was a series of elite badminton tournaments, sanctioned by the Badminton World Federation (BWF). BWF Superseries levels were Superseries and Superseries Premier. A season of Superseries consisted of twelve tournaments around the world that had been introduced since 2011. Successful players were invited to the Superseries Finals, which were held at the end of each year.

Women's doubles

  BWF Superseries Finals tournament
  BWF Superseries Premier tournament
  BWF Superseries tournament

BWF Grand Prix 
The BWF Grand Prix had two levels, the Grand Prix and Grand Prix Gold. It was a series of badminton tournaments sanctioned by the Badminton World Federation (BWF) and played between 2007 and 2017. The World Badminton Grand Prix was sanctioned by the International Badminton Federation from 1983 to 2006.

Women's singles

Women's doubles

  BWF Grand Prix Gold tournament
  BWF & IBF Grand Prix tournament

BWF International Challenge/Series (62 titles, 34 runners-up) 
Women's singles

Women's doubles

Mixed doubles

  BWF International Challenge tournament

  BWF International Series tournament
  BWF Future Series tournament

Record against selected opponents 
Includes results against Olympic quarterfinals, Worlds semifinalists, and Super Series finalists, plus all Olympic opponents.

  Huang Chia-chi 1–1
  Alesia Zaitsava 1–0
  Jiang Yanjiao 1–5
  Li Xuerui 0–1
  Liu Xin 0–1
  Lu Lan 0–2
  Wang Lin 0–1
  Wang Shixian 0–2
  Wang Xin 0–3
  Wang Yihan 0–5
  Xie Xingfang 0–3
  Zhang Ning 0–4
  Zhou Mi 0–4
  Zhu Lin 0–2
  Cheng Shao-chieh 0–1
  Tracey Hallam 2–2
  Tine Baun 3–6
  Hadia Hosny 1–0
  Pi Hongyan 3–8
  Juliane Schenk 2–9
  Xu Huaiwen 0–9
  Wang Chen 0–5
  Yip Pui Yin 1–2
  Saina Nehwal 2–6
  Adriyanti Firdasari 0–1
  Maria Kristin Yulianti 2–0
  Eriko Hirose 1–6
  Minatsu Mitani 0–1
  Sayaka Sato 2–4
  Shizuka Uchida 1–0
  Bae Youn-joo 0–1
  Seo Yoon-hee 1–1
  Sung Ji-hyun 1–2
  Mia Audina 0–1
  Wong Mew Choo 0–1
  Carolina Marín 0–1
  Sara Persson 3–3
  Porntip Buranaprasertsuk 0–1

References

External links 
 
 BWF Player Profile

1983 births
Living people
Sportspeople from Stara Zagora
Bulgarian female badminton players
Badminton players at the 2004 Summer Olympics
Badminton players at the 2008 Summer Olympics
Badminton players at the 2012 Summer Olympics
Olympic badminton players of Bulgaria
Badminton players at the 2015 European Games
European Games bronze medalists for Bulgaria
European Games medalists in badminton
20th-century Bulgarian women
21st-century Bulgarian women